Muhammad Bayyumi Mahran was an Egyptian scholar and professor of history at Alexandria University. He won Iranian Book of the Year Award for his book Historical studies from the Quoran.

Works
 Bilād al-Shām, 1990
 Dirāsāt tārīẖiyyaẗ min al-Qurʼān al-Karīm
 Fī riḥāb al-Nabī wa-āl baytihi al-ṭāhirīn
 Historical studies from the Qur'an
 Imām ʻAlī ibn Abī Ṭālib
 Madīnat Jurash al-atharīyah wa-qabīlat al-ʻAwāsij bayna al-māḍī wa-al-ḥāḍir
 Miṣr wa-al-Sharq al-Adná al-qadīm
 Sayyidah Fāṭimah al-Zahrā
 Sīrah al-Nabawīyah al-sharīfah
 Studies in ancient history of the Ara

References

20th-century Egyptian historians
Academic staff of Alexandria University